Fantastic Girl is Lee Jung-hyun's 6th album.

Tracks 4, 5, 6, 9, and 10 were featured in Audition Online, a downloadable multiplayer online rhythm dance game developed by T3 Entertainment and published by YD Online. Her outfit and hairstyle in the music video for I Love You, Chul Soo were featured as purchasable avatar accessories in the game.

Track listing
FunFun (feat. Double K)
나만봐 (Namanbwa) Just Look at Me
틀 (Teul) Formula
철수야 사랑해 (Cheolsuya Saranghae) I Love You, Chul Soo
Welcome to My style
달려 (Dallyeo) Run
남자는 여자를 귀찮게 해 (Namjaneun Yeojareul Gwichankehae) Men Annoy Women
어떻게 (Eotteoke) How
또 사랑할 수 있을까 (Tto Saranghalsu Isseulkka) Will I Be Able To Love Again?
연가 (Yeonga) Love Song
All In
니 남자를 줘 (Ni Namjareul Jwo) Give Me Your Man

References

2006 albums
Lee Jung-hyun albums